The Pelican Institute is a free market think tank headquartered in New Orleans, Louisiana. Kevin Kane founded the Pelican Institute in 2008 and served as the organization's president until his death in 2016. The Pelican Institute's goals include increased government transparency, lower taxes, and improved schools. The Institute's stated mission is "to conduct scholarly research and analysis that advances sound policies based on free enterprise, individual liberty, and constitutionally limited government." The Pelican Institute publishes policy studies and commentaries via their news outlet, The Pelican Post. Issues addressed include health care, state and federal spending, energy, environmental issues, poverty, and corruption.

References

External links
 
 The Pelican Post
 Organizational Profile – National Center for Charitable Statistics (Urban Institute)

Think tanks based in the United States
Organizations based in New Orleans
Libertarian organizations based in the United States
Libertarian think tanks